The Breech Loading 5.5-inch Mk I was a naval gun used by the British Royal Navy during both World Wars.

Naval history 

This weapon was developed by Coventry Ordnance Works in 1913 and offered to the Greek Navy as the main armament for two new cruisers building at Cammell Laird. On the outbreak Of World War I the two ships were purchased by Britain as HMS Chester and HMS Birkenhead. The RN was happy with the performance of the gun as it was significantly lighter than the standard 6 inch gun and fired an 82 lb shell rather than the 100 lb shell of the 6 inch weapon. It, therefore, had a higher rate of fire with little loss in hitting power. The British ordered more guns as secondary armament for HMS Furious and HMS Hood. A total of 81 guns were made and were used on the following ships:
HMS Chester,
HMS Birkenhead,
,
, and
HMS Hermes.

Guns removed from Chester, Birkenhead and Furious were used to arm Armed Merchant cruisers:
HMS Laurentic and HMS Montclare.

Coast defence gun 
In 1940 two were installed in Fort Bedford Battery on Ascension Island and remain there today. A pair were installed in specially built casemates on the roof of Coalhouse Fort in Essex, overlooking the Thames. Guns from the Hood also went to Bognor Regis, Pevensey, North Foreland, Dover and Folkestone.

Notable actions 

Boy Seaman First Class Jack Cornwell was posthumously awarded the Victoria Cross for heroism in serving his gun on HMS Chester during the Battle of Jutland on 31 May 1916.

Surviving examples 
 The gun served by Jack Cornwell VC is preserved in the Imperial War Museum in London.
 Fort Bedford, Cross Hill, Ascension Island has two guns from 
 Fort Skansin, Tórshavn, Streymoy Island, Faroe Islands, has two guns (No. 35 and 42) from

See also 
 List of naval guns

Weapons of comparable role, performance and era 
 Canon de 138 mm Modèle 1910 Naval gun : French equivalent
 14 cm/50 3rd Year Type naval gun : Japanese equivalent

Notes

References 
 Tony DiGiulian, British 5.5"/50 (14 cm) BL Mark I

Bibliography

External links 

Naval guns of the United Kingdom
World War I naval weapons of the United Kingdom
World War II naval weapons of the United Kingdom
Coventry Ordnance Works
140 mm artillery
Coastal artillery